Jihlava railway station is a railway station in the city of Jihlava, the capital of the Vysočina Region, Czech Republic.

History
The station was the first railway station to be built in Jihlava as part of the rail link between Vienna via Znojmo, Německý Brod, Kutná Hora and Kolín. The investor and operator was the Austrian Northwestern Railway (Österreichische Nordwestbahn, ÖNWB), the project was taken over by the main architect of this company, Viennese engineer Carl Schlimp. The first test train arrived at the railway station in Jihlava on 21 December 1870, construction works were finished that year in April. In 1871, all current tracks were in operation.

After completion, the building was one of the largest on the ÖNWB lines. The reception building had a system of numerous basements (23 cellars in total). On the ground floor there was a spacious entrance hall with two cashboxes and a wooden newspaper stand. In the left part of the building there were transport and telegraph office and a post office. In the right-hand ground floor of the building were waiting rooms I, II. and III. class. There were also water cranes that took water directly from the Jihlava river or a depot for the locomotives and wagons owned by the Austrian Northwest Railroad. In the adjoining buildings of the waterworks there was an office of a track officer, a smith, a trackside workers' shelter and an oil store.

Jihlava railway station was erected on a slope north of the city center from the ÖNWB's decision, this distant location was then widely criticized by residents and representatives of the town hall. The north-east trail runs from Německý Brod (since 1945 Havlíčkův Brod) to Třebíč, from the west is connected the track from Horní Cerekev. Even before the start of the construction itself, the variant of the construction of the station under Královský vršek hill on the line to Horní Cerekev and Veselí nad Lužnicí was taken into consideration. In October 1887, the second railway station, later named Jihlava-město (Jihlava-City), was opened here.

In the years 1890-1900, the railway station underwent a major reconstruction and modernization in order to serve the growing volumes of rail transport, freight especially. During the subsequent modifications extending until 1912, a loading ramp, a waterworks, a laundry room, an ice cellar, a reception building, a barracks, a shed with a load, a ramp, a kerosene depot, a coal slide, a coal cellar, a transfer hall, a workshop, a carriage house for 20 locomotives, coal sheds, wood warehouse, stock material, station warehouse, farm sheds, wooden loading ramps, clerical and service residential buildings.

Since 1908, the electric „malodráha“ (tram line) has been running from the center to the station after a wooden bridge over the Jihlava river has replaced a solid Art Nouveau concrete structure. The timetable was coordinated with departures and arrivals of trains. On this occasion, electricity was installed in the building of the station, this tram line was later replaced by trolleybuses. As part of the nationalization of private railway companies in the Austro-Hungarian Empire, both railway stations in the city underwent a single administration in 1913.

In 1892 the Chancellor of the German Empire Otto von Bismarck arrived at Iglau Nordwestbahnhof during his visit in the city.

Name
In 1871 station was named Iglau (Jihlava), in 1888 the name was changed to Iglau Nordwestbahnhof, and later in 1921 to Jihlava.

Literature 
 Alois ŠIMKA, Sto let Severozápadní dráhy, OA Jihlava 1971, p. 13. (Czech)
 SOkA Jihlava, Archiv města Jihlavy po r. 1849, stavební archiv, odd. železnice (Czech)
 SOkA Jihlava, Městská správa Jihlava/Hospodářská registratura VII-li, k. 500, sign. 730. (Czech)
 Mojmír KREJČIŘÍK, Po stopách našich železnic, Praha 1991, p. 150. (Czech)

External links 

 Detailed history of rail transport in Jihlava (Czech)
 Article about upcoming reconstruction of the station (2017) (Czech)
 Plan of the station (Czech)

Railway stations in Vysočina Region
Railway stations opened in 1871
Carl Schlimp railway stations
19th-century establishments in Bohemia
Buildings and structures in Jihlava
Railway stations in the Czech Republic opened in the 19th century